Lachlan McNeil is a Canadian freestyle wrestler and folkstyle wrestler from North York, Ontario, Canada. During his professional career Lachlan has won two Canadian Freestyle titles earning the right to represent Team Canada at the 2022 World Wrestling Championships. He was a silver medalist at the 2022 Commonwealth Games in Birmingham, England. Lachlan also wrestles for The University of North Carolina at Chapel Hill.

Freestyle career 
Lachlan wrestled at the 2022 World Wrestling Championships representing team Canada. He earned a silver medal at the 2022 Commonwealth Games. He earned a bronze medal at the 2022 Grand Prix of Spain.

College career 
All-American at the 2023 NCAA Division I Wrestling Championships for the University of North Carolina. Finished third at the 2023 ACC Wrestling Championships.

References

2001 births
Living people
Canadian wrestlers
Commonwealth Games medallists in wrestling
Commonwealth Games silver medallists for Canada‎
North Carolina Tar Heels wrestlers